Vaino, A Boy of New Finland is a children's novel written by Julia Davis Adams and illustrated by Lempi Ostman. It was published in 1929, and was retroactively awarded the Newbery Honor citation the next year.

Newbery Honor-winning works
1929 American novels
Novels set in Finland
American children's novels
1929 children's books